Lower Hutt is a city in the Wellington Region of New Zealand. Administered by the Hutt City Council, it is one of the four cities that constitute the Wellington metropolitan area.

It is separated from the city of Wellington by the harbour, and from Upper Hutt by the Taita Gorge.

Lower Hutt is unique among New Zealand cities, as the name of the council does not match the name of the city it governs. Special legislation has since 1991 given the council the name "Hutt City Council", while the name of the place itself remains "Lower Hutt City". This name has led to confusion, as Upper Hutt is administered by a separate city council, the Upper Hutt City Council. The entire Hutt Valley includes both Lower and Upper Hutt cities. Lower Hutt is also often simply called "the Hutt".

History
Before European settlement, thick forest covered most of the Hutt Valley, with areas of marshland close to the river's mouth. Māori inhabited the shoreline, with a pā at each end of Petone beach.

Māori welcomed the arrival of the New Zealand Company ship Tory in 1839, and William Wakefield (the company's agent) negotiated with some local chiefs to allow settlement. The first immigrant ship, the Aurora, arrived on 22 January 1840, an event still commemorated every year on the Monday closest as Wellington's Anniversary Day. A settlement, Britannia, grew up close to the mouth of the Hutt River (Te Awa Kairangi in Māori language), and settlers set up New Zealand's first newspaper and bank.

The city takes its name from the English name given to the river, named after one of the founding members, director and chairman of the New Zealand Company, Sir William Hutt. The dual name of Hutt River Te Awa Kairangi has been used since 2010.

Within weeks of settlement the Hutt River flooded, and in March 1840 the majority of Britannia settlers decided to move to Thorndon, ( in the heart of Wellington city), though some settlers remained at the north end of the harbour. In the 1840s an area on the west bank of the Hutt River, in what is now Alicetown, formed the village then known as Aglionby.

In 1846 conflict arose between European settlers and Māori, which led to armed conflict in the Hutt Valley Campaign.

The 1855 Wairarapa earthquake (in the range of magnitude 8.1 to 8.3) raised part of the lower valley, allowing reclamation of land from swamp. The fault escarpment from the earthquake is still visible, notably at Hutt Central School.

On New Year's Day 1859 the first permanent lighthouse to be built in New Zealand was lit at Pencarrow Head. New Zealand's only female lighthouse keeper, Mary Jane Bennett, became the inaugural operator of the lighthouse.

The railway line from central Wellington reached Lower Hutt station (subsequently Western Hutt) in April 1874, with the line running north up the west side of the Hutt River to Silverstream opening two years later.

Before the Second World War of 1939–1945, urban settlement in the lower Hutt Valley concentrated mainly on Petone, central Lower Hutt and Eastbourne, with a total population of 30,000. In 1927 the Public Works Department completed the construction of a branch railway line to Waterloo on the east side of the river; the route diverging from the main line between Lower Hutt and Petone. Two years later the railway workshops moved from Petone to a new larger site off the new branch at Woburn.

In the late 1940s new suburbs of state housing developed along the eastern side of the Hutt Valley, from Waiwhetū to Taitā (then known as Taita), to alleviate nationwide housing shortages and to cater for the booming population. Between 1946 and 1954 the railway line from Waterloo extended through these new suburbs to Haywards, becoming the main line in 1954 when the existing main line between Haywards and Melling closed. By the end of the 1950s, Lower Hutt had a population of 80,000.

Government

Local

The Hutt City Council comprises a mayor and 12 councillors. Campbell Barry became New Zealand's youngest mayor and was first elected in 2019, succeeding Ray Wallace. The city's six electoral wards (Northern, Western, Central, Eastern, Harbour and Wainuiomata) each elect one councillor, with the remaining six councillors elected at-large.

Mayor and councillors elected in the 2022 local-body elections:

Neighbouring councils are Wellington City Council (adjoining to the west), Porirua City Council to the north, Upper Hutt City Council to the north-east and South Wairarapa District Council to the east. The boundaries of the Lower Hutt city local body have evolved from a series of amalgamations and boundary changes over the years.

The Hutt County Council, established in 1877, covered the region from Wellington's south coast up to Waikanae, excluding the Wellington City Council area. As the region grew, urban parts of the Hutt County became autonomous boroughs: Petone in 1888, Lower Hutt in 1891, Eastbourne in 1906, Johnsonville in 1908, Upper Hutt in 1908, Porirua in 1962 and Kapiti in 1974. In 1941 Lower Hutt became a city. It incorporated Normandale in 1957.

In 1987–1989 the New Zealand Government forced local authorities to consolidate, which led to Lower Hutt amalgamating with the adjacent Boroughs of Petone and Eastbourne and with the Wainuiomata District (which had its independence for barely a year), and to the abolition of the Hutt County Council.

National
The area of Lower Hutt is covered by two general electorates (Hutt South and Remutaka) and by two Māori electorates (Ikaroa-Rāwhiti in the north and Te Tai Tonga in the south).

Coat of arms

Geography
The city centres on the lower southern valley of the Hutt River, to the northeast of the city of Wellington. The valley widens into a delta as the river nears its mouth, so the central urban area of the city forms a triangle with its longest side along the shoreline. In the upper reaches of the city the Western and Eastern Hutt Hills become closer, culminating in the Taitā Gorge at the northern end of Lower Hutt, separating the city from neighbouring Upper Hutt.

Lower Hutt includes the cluster of small settlements that extend down the eastern coast of Wellington Harbour. These include the two large townships of Wainuiomata and Eastbourne. The city also includes a large area of sparsely-populated land to the east of the harbour, extending to Pencarrow Head and into the Remutaka Range. Lower Hutt's boundaries also include the islands in Wellington Harbour, the largest of which is Matiu / Somes Island.

Climate
Lower Hutt has a wet oceanic climate (Köppen climate classification: Cfb), which is similar to nearby Wellington, with relatively warm summers and mild winters with the occasional storm.

Te Awa Kairangi / Hutt River

A single major aquifer dominates the lower Hutt Valley: the river, originally named Heretaunga, and since 2010 known as "Te Awa Kairangi / Hutt River". Awakairangi in the Māori language means "river of food from the sky".

Lower Hutt occupies the lower regions of the flood plain of the river, one of the most significant features of the city. In the 20th century the Hutt River Board built stopbanks to contain the river, but the threat of flooding from heavy rainfall persists. In 1985 the river burst its banks, and since then floods have been on a smaller scale. Smaller streams and storm-water drains have also caused occasional problems when rainfall exceeds average levels.

Much of the land adjacent to the river is protected as reserve by the City Council and managed by the Greater Wellington Regional Council to provide popular recreational areas. From the river mouth, walking and cycling trails and grassed areas occur at various points along both sides of the river up the Hutt Valley to Te Mārua, 28 km further north in Upper Hutt.

With lower river-levels in mid-summer, algal blooms have contributed to making slow-flowing areas anoxic. The Regional Council has cited the algal blooms as the cause of death of a small number of dogs swimming in the river, as well as of skin reactions in the case of swimmers.

Seven bridges cross the Hutt River within the city of Lower Hutt, with several other bridges built and replaced from the 1850s onwards.

Tributaries of the Hutt River within Lower Hutt include:

 Waiwhetū Stream
 Te Mome Stream
 Opahu Stream (Black Creek)

Suburbs
Here are listed the following suburbs of Lower Hutt City (unofficial suburbs are in italics).

Northern Ward
Pomare2; Stokes Valley2; Taitā2

Western Ward
Haywards1; Manor Park1; Kelson1; Belmont1; Tirohanga1; Harbour View1; Melling1; Normandale1; Maungaraki1; Alicetown1

Central Ward
Avalon2; Boulcott2; Epuni2; Lower Hutt Central2; Woburn2

Eastern Ward
Wingate2; Naenae2; Fairfield2; Waterloo2;

Harbour Ward – Petone Community Board
Ava1; Korokoro1; Petone1; Waiwhetū2; Moera2; Gracefield2; Seaview2;

Harbour Ward – Eastbourne Community Board
Point Howard3; Sorrento Bay3; Lowry Bay3; York Bay3; Māhina Bay3; Sunshine Bay3; Days Bay3; Eastbourne3

Wainuiomata Ward
Wainuiomata2; Wainuiomata Coast; Pencarrow Head; Arakura; Homedale village; Wainuiomata West; Glendale

Notes:

1 – Suburbs west of the Hutt River
2 – Suburbs east of the Hutt River
3 – Suburbs from the Eastern Harbour

Demographics

The city's population has remained stable since the 1990s. In the five years between the 2013 and 2018 censuses, the population grew steadily across the city with an increasing amount of homes being purchased and the area seen as more affordable comparable to the rest of the region.

Lower Hutt City had a population of 104,532 at the 2018 New Zealand census, an increase of 6,294 people (6.4%) since the 2013 census, and an increase of 6,831 people (7.0%) since the 2006 census. There were 37,161 households. There were 51,369 males and 53,163 females, giving a sex ratio of 0.97 males per female. The median age was 36.9 years (compared with 37.4 years nationally), with 21,135 people (20.2%) aged under 15 years, 20,682 (19.8%) aged 15 to 29, 48,480 (46.4%) aged 30 to 64, and 14,232 (13.6%) aged 65 or older.

Ethnicities were 67.6% European/Pākehā, 18.4% Māori, 11.5% Pacific peoples, 15.2% Asian, and 3.0% other ethnicities. People may identify with more than one ethnicity.

The percentage of people born overseas was 25.4, compared with 27.1% nationally.

Although some people objected to giving their religion, 46.4% had no religion, 38.2% were Christian, 3.8% were Hindu, 1.0% were Muslim, 1.2% were Buddhist and 3.3% had other religions.

Of those at least 15 years old, 20,616 (24.7%) people had a bachelor or higher degree, and 14,100 (16.9%) people had no formal qualifications. The median income was $34,700, compared with $31,800 nationally. 16,173 people (19.4%) earned over $70,000 compared to 17.2% nationally. The employment status of those at least 15 was that 43,563 (52.2%) people were employed full-time, 11,337 (13.6%) were part-time, and 3,987 (4.8%) were unemployed.

Economy

Historically, Petone, Seaview and Gracefield have been the main area for industry in the Wellington region, with industries including meat processing and freezing, motor vehicle assembly, and timber processing. As business have taken advantage of global manufacturing efficiencies, much of this large scale industry has changed to smaller design-led and medium-sized industries exporting to the world. Over the past 25 years service, distribution, and consumer-oriented sectors have increased. Lower Hutt remains the main location for light industrial activity in the Wellington Region.

Until post-war housing development took over, the central and northern areas of the city were largely market gardens.

In 2010 the lower reaches of the Waiwhetū Stream was cleaned up to remove toxins from decades of industry use. The channel was also widened to better protect against floods and native plantings and management has seen native waterlife and birds return to their habitat.

Petone's Jackson Street and neighbouring areas have seen a resurgence in to one of Wellington's most popular retail and hospitality area.

Lower Hutt has one of the greatest proportion of science, technology and high value manufacturing businesses in New Zealand. Crown research institute GNS Science and New Zealand's innovation centre and business accelerator Callaghan Innovation are based in Lower Hutt, along with over 800 research organisations in high-end manufacturing, research and technology.

The suburb of Avalon was home to New Zealand's television industry from 1975 until the late 1980s. The Avalon film and television studios were New Zealand's first purpose-built television studios, and is the largest television studio complex in New Zealand and Australasia. The studios were home to Television One from 1975 to 1980, when it merged with South Pacific Television to form Television New Zealand (TVNZ). After 1989 most of TVNZ's operations moved to Auckland, and the studios were eventually sold off in 2012 to a consortium of Wellington investors. Avalon continues to operate independently with seven film and television studios used as primarily as a feature film production base.

A large proportion of Lower Hutt's residents commute to the mainly commercial, service and government offices in Wellington City 12 km to the south-west.

The Civil Aviation Authority of New Zealand (CAA) has its headquarters in Aviation House in Petone, Lower Hutt.

Culture and leisure

Several education and research facilities of national significance are in the southern half of the city. Cultural facilities include the Petone Settlers Museum, War Memorial Library, Dowse Art Museum and Vogel House.

The city possesses civic administration buildings constructed in the 1950s that are regarded as representative architecture of the era. A building of national significance is Vogel House, a two-storey wooden residence that was the official residence of the Prime Minister of New Zealand for much of the 20th century. It is a prime example of early colonial architecture in New Zealand and operates today as a tourist attraction.

The city is popular for outdoor sports, especially mountain biking, hiking, recreational walking and fishing. The central city is home to Queensgate Shopping Centre, the largest shopping centre in the lower North Island. The Riverbank car park adjacent to the central city is home to a Saturday produce market.

Among the filming locations for The Lord of the Rings directed by Peter Jackson, Dry Creek quarry, which dominates the hills above the suburb of Taitā, became the site for a huge medieval castle built for scenes of Helm's Deep and Minas Tirith.

Education

Lower Hutt has four state secondary schools: Taita College, Naenae College, Hutt Valley High School and Wainuiomata High School. Other secondary schools include Chilton Saint James School, a private girls school; Raphael House Rudolf Steiner School, a state integrated Waldorf education school; Sacred Heart College, a state integrated Catholic girls school; St Bernard's College, a state integrated Catholic boys school; and St Oran's College, a state integrated Presbyterian girls school.

The city is home to two tertiary institutes: the Wellington Institute of Technology in Petone, and The Open Polytechnic of New Zealand in Waterloo.

Media

The city is served by The Dominion Post, The Hutt News and community newspapers.

Local LPFM radio station The Cheese broadcasts in the city, and is licensed with APRA and PPNZ in New Zealand for music broadcasting rights. It began Saturday 1 July 2006 and its original frequency was at 88.4 FM from Wainuiomata.  The station can be heard in Lower Hutt on 87.9 MHz FM with simulcasting via their official website. Subscribers to Vodafone TV can hear The Cheese on channel 417. The station broadcasts a mix of music from the 80s, 90s, recent and current hits.

Flora and fauna
Hills to about 350 m (1000 ft) line both sides of the valley within the city limits. The western hills have been populated as residential areas, but the eastern side is protected and clad in native bush and scrub, and the ubiquitous gorse in areas that have been cleared as a result of scrub fires or earlier human activity.

Native birds are common, including the New Zealand pigeon, tui, grey fantail, silvereye, shining cuckoo (in season), grey warbler and morepork. Introduced species include the common blackbird, song thrush, house sparrow, European goldfinch, common chaffinch, common starling, and Australian magpie.

Notable people

 Ginny Andersen (born 1975), politician
 Chris Bishop (born 1983), politician
 Russell Brown (born 1962), media commentator
 Terence Burns (born 1938), cricketer
 Gordon Onslow Hilbury Burt (1893-1968), photographer
 Tāmati Coffey (born 1979), politician
 Julian Dennison (born 2002), child actor
 Kerry Fox (born 1966), actor
 Brooke Fraser (born 1983), singer and songwriter
 James Hector (1834–1907), geologist, naturalist, and surgeon (died in Lower Hutt)
 Veranoa Hetet (born 1966), Māori weaver and contemporary artist
 Peter Hogg (1939–2020), Canadian lawyer, author and legal scholar best known as the leading authority on Canadian constitutional law
 Lloyd Jones (born 1955), author
 Alan MacDiarmid (1927–2007), Nobel laureate
 Brad McKay (born 1979), Australian medical doctor, sceptic, television personality and author
 Peter Mulgrew (1927–1979), mountaineer, yachtsman and businessman
 Sir Walter Nash (1882–1968), New Zealand Prime Minister (1957–60), MP for Hutt from 1929 to 1968
 Anna Paquin (born 1982), Oscar-winning actress
 Haylee Partridge (born 1981), cricketer 
 Erenora Puketapu-Hetet (1941–2006), Māori weaver and author
 Eddie Rayner (born 1952), keyboardist for Split Enz (1974–1984)
 Tana Umaga (born 1973), former All Blacks captain, former player and current rugby union coach
 Holly Walker (born 1982), politician
 Piri Weepu (born 1983), former All Blacks player and current rugby union player
 Puti Tipene Watene (1910–1967), rugby league footballer and politician
 Nick Willis (born 1983), two-time Olympic medallist
 Megan Mansell (born 1990), New Zealand broadcaster

Sister cities

Hutt's sister cities are:
Minoh, Japan (1995)
Taizhou, China (2008)
Tempe, United States (1981)

Since 2000, Hutt also has friendly relations with Xi'an, China.

Gallery

References

Bibliography

External links

 Hutt City Council official website
 Hutt Valley Tourism official website
 Lower Hutt City (Name of City Council) Act 1991
 Maungaraki website
 HuttCam website
 New Zealand Racing Board
 GNS Science

 
Populated places in the Wellington Region
Populated places on Te Awa Kairangi / Hutt River
Hutt Valley